{{DISPLAYTITLE:Dopamine receptor D4}}

The dopamine receptor D4 is a dopamine D2-like G protein-coupled receptor encoded by the  gene on chromosome 11 at 11p15.5.

The structure of DRD4 was recently reported in complex with the antipsychotic drug nemonapride.

As with other dopamine receptor subtypes, the  D4 receptor is activated by the neurotransmitter dopamine. It is linked to many neurological and psychiatric conditions including schizophrenia and bipolar disorder, ADHD, addictive behaviors, Parkinson's disease, and eating disorders such as anorexia nervosa.  A weak association has been drawn between DRD4 and borderline personality disorder.

It is also a target for drugs which treat schizophrenia and Parkinson's disease. The D4 receptor is considered to be D2-like in which the activated receptor inhibits the enzyme adenylate cyclase, thereby reducing the intracellular concentration of the second messenger cyclic AMP.

Genetics 
The human protein is coded by the DRD4 on chromosome 11 located in 11p15.5.

There are slight variations (mutations/polymorphisms) in the human gene:
 A 48-base pair VNTR in exon 3
 C-521T in the promoter
 13-base pair deletion of bases 235 to 247 in exon 1
 12 base pair repeat in exon 1
 Val194Gly
 A polymorphic tandem duplication of 48 bp

Mutations in this gene have been associated with various behavioral phenotypes, including autonomic nervous system dysfunction, attention deficit/hyperactivity disorder, schizophrenia and the personality trait of novelty seeking.

48-base pair VNTR 
The 48-base pair variable number tandem repeat (VNTR) in exon 3 range from 2 to 11 repeats. Dopamine is more potent at the D4 receptor with 2 allelic repeat or 7 allelic repeats than the variant with 4 allelic repeats.

DRD4-7R, the 7-repeat (7R) variant of DRD4 (DRD4 7-repeat polymorphism), has been linked to a susceptibility for developing ADHD in several meta-analyses and other psychological traits and disorders. Adults and children with the DRD4 7-repeat polymorphism show variations in auditory-evoked gamma oscillations, which may be related to attention processing.

The frequency of the alleles varies greatly between populations, e.g., the 7-repeat version has high incidence in America and low in Asia. "Long" versions of polymorphisms are the alleles with 6 to 10 repeats. 7R appears to react less strongly to dopamine molecules.

The 48-base pair VNTR has been the subject of much speculation about its evolution and role in human behaviors cross-culturally. The 7R allele appears to have been selected for about 40,000 years ago. In 1999 Chen and colleagues observed that populations who migrated farther in the past 30,000 to 1,000 years ago had a higher frequency of 7R/long alleles. They also showed that nomadic populations had higher frequencies of 7R alleles than sedentary ones. More recently it was observed that the health status of nomadic Ariaal men was higher if they had 7R alleles. However, in recently sedentary (non-nomadic) Ariaal those with 7R alleles seemed to have slightly deteriorated health.

Novelty seeking

Despite early findings of an association between the DRD4 48bp VNTR and novelty seeking (a normal characteristic of exploratory and excitable people), a 2008 meta-analysis compared 36 published studies of novelty seeking  and the polymorphism and found no effect. Results are consistent with novelty-seeking behavior being a complex trait associated with many genes, and the variance attributable to DRD4 by itself being very small. The meta-analysis of 11 studies did find that another polymorphism in the gene, the -521C/T, showed an association with novelty seeking. While human results are not strong, research in animals has suggested stronger associations  and new evidence suggests that human encroachment may exert selection pressure in favor of DRD4 variants associated with novelty seeking.

Cognition 
Several studies have shown that agonists that activate the D4 receptor increase working memory performance and fear acquisition in monkeys and rodents according to a U-shaped dose response curve. However, antagonists of the D4 receptor reverse stress-induced or drug-induced working memory deficits. Gamma oscillations, which may be correlated with cognitive processing, can be increased by D4R agonists, but are not significantly reduced by D4R antagonists.

Cognitive development
Several studies have suggested that parenting may affect the cognitive development of children with the 7-repeat allele of DRD4. Parenting that has maternal sensitivity, mindfulness, and autonomy–support at 15 months was found to alter children's executive functions at 18 to 20 months. Children with poorer quality parenting were more impulsive and sensation seeking than those with higher quality parenting. Higher quality parenting was associated with better executive control in 4-year-olds.

Ligands

Agonists
 WAY-100635: potent full agonist, with 5-HT1A antagonistic component
 A-412,997: full agonist, > 100-fold selective over a panel of seventy different receptors and ion channels
 ABT-724 - developed for treatment of erectile dysfunction
 ABT-670 - better oral bioavailability than ABT-724
 FAUC 316: partial agonist, > 8600-fold selective over other dopamine receptor subtypes
 FAUC 299: partial agonist
 F-15063: antipsychotic with partial D4 agonism
 (E)-1-aryl-3-(4-pyridinepiperazin-1-yl)propanone oximes
 PIP3EA: partial agonist
 Flibanserin - partial agonist
 PD-168,077 - D4 selective but also binds to α1A, α2C and 5HT1A
 CP-226,269 - D4 selective but also binds to D2, D3, α2A, α2C and 5HT1A
 Ro10-5824 – partial agonist
 Roxindole – D4 selective but also D2 and D3 autoreceptor agonist, 5HT1A receptor agonist, serotonin reuptake inhibitor)
 Apomorphine – D4 selective but also D2 and D3 agonist, α-adrenergic and serotonergic weak antagonist

Antagonists
 A-381393: potent, subtype selective antagonist (>2700-fold)
 FAUC 213
 L-745,870
 L-750,667
 ML-398
 S 18126 - also σ1 affinity
 Fananserin – mixed 5-HT2A / D4 antagonist
Olanzapine, an atypical antipsychotic
 Buspirone, an anxiolytic

Inverse agonists
 FAUC F41: inverse agonist, subtype selectivity of more than 3 orders of magnitude over D2 and D3

In popular culture 

Michael Connelly’s 2020 crime novel Fair Warning (ISBN 978-0-316-53942-5) revolves around a serial killer who uses DNA profiles obtained on the Dark Web to target female victims, specifically those whose DRD4 profiles allegedly make them more susceptible to risk taking and sexual promiscuity.

See also 
 Dopamine hypothesis of psychosis

References

External links 
 
 Current Research on the DRD4 Gene
 
 
 
 

Dopamine receptors
Biology of attention deficit hyperactivity disorder
Genes on human chromosome 11